The Vicar Apostolic of the Northern District may refer to:

 Vicar Apostolic of the Northern District (England), a precursor title of the Roman Catholic Bishop of Hexham and Newcastle.
 Vicar Apostolic of the Northern District (Scotland), a precursor title of the restored Roman Catholic Bishop of Aberdeen.